The Women's mass start competition at the 2020 World Single Distances Speed Skating Championships was held on February 16, 2020.

Results
The race was started at 14:20. 16 laps were raced with four sprints.

References

Women's mass start